General elections were held in Barbados in 1940. The Voters Association won all but five of the seats in the House of Assembly, with the Barbados Progressive League winning the remaining five.

Results

References

Barbados
1940 in Barbados
Elections in Barbados
Election and referendum articles with incomplete results